Cecidochares eupatorii is a species of tephritid or fruit flies in the genus Cecidochares of the family Tephritidae.

Distribution
Bolivia, Argentina.

References

Tephritinae
Insects described in 1910
Diptera of South America